As the Roman Republic, and later the Roman Empire, expanded, it came to include people from a variety of cultures, and religions. The worship of an ever increasing number of deities was tolerated and accepted. The government, and the Romans in general, tended to be tolerant towards most religions and religious practices. Some religions were banned for political reasons rather than dogmatic zeal, and other rites which involved human sacrifice were banned.

When Christianity became the state church of the Roman Empire, it came to accept that it was the Roman emperor's duty to use secular power to enforce religious unity. Anyone within the church who did not subscribe to catholic Christianity was seen as a threat to the dominance and purity of the "one true faith" and they saw it as their right to defend this by all means at their disposal. This led to persecution of pagans by the Christian authorities and populace after its institution as the state religion.

Under Roman Paganism

Religious tolerance and intolerance
The Roman Empire typically tolerated other religions insofar as they conformed to Roman notions of what proper religion meant and if their deities could be mapped onto Roman deities. Otherwise, the Romans produced a series of persecutions of offending and nonconforming religions.

In the early 3rd century, Cassius Dio outlined the Roman imperial policy towards religious tolerance:

The Bacchanals

In 186 BC, the Roman senate issued a decree that severely restricted the Bacchanals, ecstatic rites celebrated in honor of Dionysus. Livy records that this persecution was due to the fact that "there was nothing wicked, nothing flagitious, that had not been practiced among them" and that a "greater number were executed than thrown into prison; indeed, the multitude of men and women who suffered in both ways, was very considerable". Livy describes the Roman perceptions of the Bacchanals sect (which he shared) in his Livy Ab Urbe Condita Libri (38.9-18), among these descriptions being:

On a bronze tablet found in Tiriolo, Italy in 1640, a Roman decree reads:

Druids
Druids were seen as essentially non-Roman: a prescript of Augustus forbade Roman citizens to practice "druidical" rites. Pliny reports that under Tiberius the druids were suppressed—along with diviners and physicians—by a decree of the Senate, and Claudius forbade their rites completely in 54 AD. Druids were alleged to practice human sacrifice, a practice abhorrent to the Romans. Pliny the Elder (23–79 AD) wrote "It is beyond calculation how great is the debt owed to the Romans, who swept away the monstrous rites, in which to kill a man was the highest religious duty and for him to be eaten a passport to health."

Judaism

Tiberius forbade Judaism in Rome, and Claudius expelled them from the city. However, the passage of Suetonius is ambiguous: "Because the Jews at Rome caused continuous disturbances at the instigation of Chrestus he [Claudius] expelled them from the city".

The Crisis under Caligula (37–41) has been proposed as the "first open break between Rome and the Jews", but the problems were already evident during the Census of Quirinius in AD 6 and under Sejanus (before 31).

After a series of Jewish–Roman wars (66–135), Hadrian changed the name of Judea province to Syria Palaestina and Jerusalem to Aelia Capitolina in an attempt to erase the historical ties of the Jewish people to the region. In addition, after 70, Jews and Jewish proselytes were only allowed to practice their religion if they paid the Fiscus Judaicus, and after 135 were barred from Aelia Capitolina except for the day of Tisha B'Av.

Manichaeism
The first official reaction and legislation against Manichaeism from the Roman state took place under Diocletian. In an official edict called the De Maleficiis et Manichaeis (302) compiled in the Collatio Legum Mosaicarum et Romanarum and addressed to the proconsul of Africa, Diocletian wrote

We have heard that the Manichaens [...] have set up new and hitherto unheard-of sects in opposition to the older creeds so that they might cast out the doctrines vouchsafed to us in the past by the divine favour for the benefit of their own depraved doctrine. They have sprung forth very recently like new and unexpected monstrosities among the race of the Persians - a nation still hostile to us - and have made their way into our empire, where they are committing many outrages, disturbing the tranquility of our people and even inflicting grave damage to the civic communities. We have cause to fear that with the passage of time they will endeavour, as usually happens, to infect the modest and tranquil of an innocent nature with the damnable customs and perverse laws of the Persians as with the poison of a malignant (serpent) ... We order that the authors and leaders of these sects be subjected to severe punishment, and, together with their abominable writings, burnt in the flames. We direct their followers, if they continue recalcitrant, shall suffer capital punishment, and their goods be forfeited to the imperial treasury. And if those who have gone over to that hitherto unheard-of, scandalous and wholly infamous creed, or to that of the Persians, are persons who hold public office, or are of any rank or of superior social status, you will see to it that their estates are confiscated and the offenders sent to the (quarry) at Phaeno or the mines at Proconnesus. And in order that this plague of iniquity shall be completely extirpated from this our most happy age, let your devotion hasten to carry out our orders and commands.

Christianity

According to Jacob Neusner, the only religion in antiquity that was persistently outlawed and subject of systematic persecution was not Judaism, but Christianity. Christian martyrs were a significant part of Early Christianity, until the Peace of the Church in 313.

Suetonius mentions passingly that "[during Nero's reign] Punishments were also inflicted on the Christians, a sect professing a new and mischievous religious belief" but he doesn't explain for what they were punished.

Tacitus reports that after the Great Fire of Rome in 64 some in the population held Nero responsible and that to diffuse blame, he targeted and blamed the Christians (or Chrestians).

The Romans tended towards syncretism, seeing the same gods under different names in different places of the Empire. This being so, they were generally tolerant and accommodating towards new deities and the religious experiences of other peoples who formed part of their wider Empire. This general tolerance was not extended to religions that were hostile to the state nor any that claimed exclusive rights to religious beliefs and practice. By its very nature the exclusive faith of the Jews and Christians set them apart from other people, but whereas the former group was in the main contained within a single national, ethnic grouping, the latter was active and successful in seeking converts for the new religion and made universal claims not limited to a single geographical area.

The Masoretic Text, the earliest surviving copy of which dates from the 9th century AD, teaches that "the Gods of the gentiles are nothing", the corresponding passage in the Greek Septuagint, used by the early Christian Church, asserted that "all the gods of the heathens are devils." The same gods whom the Romans believed had protected and blessed their city and its wider empire during the many centuries they had been worshipped were now demonized by the early Christian Church.

The Romans protected the integrity of religions practiced by communities under their rule, seeing it as inherently correct to honor one's ancestral traditions; for this reason the Romans for a long time tolerated the highly exclusive Jewish sect, even though some Romans despised it. It was not so with the early Christian community which was perceived at times to be a new and intrinsically destabilising influence and a threat to the peace of Rome, a religio illicita. The pagans who attributed the misfortunes of Rome and its wider Empire to the rise of Christianity, and who could only see a restoration by a return to the old ways, were faced by the Christian Church that had set itself apart from that faith and was unwilling to dilute what it held to be the religion of the "one true God".

After the initial conflicts between the state and the new emerging religion during which early Christians were periodically subject to intense persecution, Gallienus issued an edict of toleration in 259 for all religious creeds including Christianity, a re-affirmation of the policy of Alexander Severus.

Under Christianity

The first episodes started late in the reign of Constantine the Great, when he ordered the pillaging and the tearing down of some pagan temples. The first anti-pagan laws by the Christian state started with Constantine's son Constantius II, who was an unwavering opponent of paganism; he ordered the closing of all pagan temples, forbade pagan sacrifices under pain of death, and removed the traditional Altar of Victory from the Senate. Under his reign ordinary Christians started vandalizing many of the ancient pagan temples, tombs and monuments.

From 361 until 375, paganism received a relative tolerance, until three Emperors, Gratian, Valentinian II and Theodosius I, under bishop of Milan Saint Ambrose's major influence, reprised and escalated the persecution. Under Ambrose's zealous pressure, Theodosius issued the infamous 391 "Theodosian decrees," a declaration of war on paganism, the Altar of Victory was removed again by Gratian, Vestal Virgins disbanded, access to pagan temples prohibited.

See also
 Christianization
 Hypatia of Alexandria
 Religion in ancient Rome

References

Bibliography

 H.A.Drake, Lambs into Lions: explaining early Christian intolerance, Past and Present 153 (1996), 3–36, Oxford Journals
 Peter Garnsey, Religious Toleration in Classical Antiquity, in: W.J.Sheils (Ed.), Persecution and Toleration, Studies in Church History 21 (1984), 1–27
 Ramsay MacMullen, Christianizing the Roman Empire: AD 100-400 (1989)
 ——, Christianity and Paganism in the Fourth to Eighth Centuries (1997) 

Persecution of early Christians
Persecution of pagans in the late Roman Empire
Religion in the Roman Empire